List of MPs elected in the 1790 British general election

This is a list of the 558 MPs or Members of Parliament elected to the 314 constituencies of the Parliament of Great Britain in 1790, the 17th Parliament of Great Britain and their replacements returned at subsequent by-elections, arranged by constituency.



By-elections 
List of Great Britain by-elections (1790–1800)

See also
List of parliaments of Great Britain
Unreformed House of Commons

References

1790
 
1790 in Great Britain
Lists of Members of the Parliament of Great Britain